Worplesdon is a village  NNW of Guildford in Surrey, England and a large dispersed civil parish that includes the settlements of: Worplesdon itself (including its central church area, Perry Hill), Fairlands, Jacobs Well, Rydeshill and Wood Street Village, all various-sized smaller settlements, well-connected by footpaths and local roads. Its area includes Whitmoor Common, which can be a collective term for all of its commons.

History

Early history
South of Broad Street, east of Wood Street Village on a farm in Broad Street Common are ruins of a Roman Villa – for further details see the Guildford article, as it is directly by the major town's western edge however in this parish.

Worplesdon has a Grade I C of E church, St Mary's with a 13th-century chancel and later additions. Worplesdon's single manor appears in Domesday Book of 1086 as Werpesdune held by Turald (Thorold) from Roger de Montgomery.  Its domesday assets were: 6½ hides; a church, 9 ploughs, a mill worth 2s 6d,  of meadow, wood worth 60 hogs. Its 22 households (of which one was a serf's) rendered £10 sterling per year to its overlords.

Early manorial owners includes (all cited as "de..."): Basseville, Holeye, (13th century) Wykford, Wintershall/Wintershull, Seymour (14th century); Ditton, Hegham, Wykford.  Then we see Jasper Tudor (Earl of Pembroke, then created the Duke of Bedford) who was attainted, however following Edward IV's grant to the Duke of Clarence in 1474, it reverted to the last Duke of Bedford of the medieval creation (who died, childless).

Sir Anthony Browne and his son, Anthony Browne, 1st Viscount Montagu, gained a royal lease of the manor in the Tudor period, followed by Lord Annandale in 1625 for three lifetimes.  The Harbord family next held it followed by John Payne of Hurtmore and Thomas Newton of Stoke (next Guildford) who owned it in 1670.  Its owners until 1911 acquired what remained of the estate as early as in 1681, the Onslow family, historically Earls of Surrey.

The parish was divided into four tithings: Perry Hill, about the hill on which the church stands; Burpham, on the east side; West End; and Wyke. The last, which was separated from the rest of the parish, was added to Ash in 1890.

Later Manors
Frenches
The reputed and lost Frenches manor represented the knight's fee held there by Richard le French in 1349.  In 1402 John French released the manor of Frenches to Robert Oyldesborough, brewer, of London, having briefly been held by William Hamonde, probably in trust and passed to Robert Russell in 1598.  It is probably represented by Russell Place Farm. Anthony Russell was living in Worplesdon when Symmes wrote, about 1676.

Merist Wood
In 1742 a related fine (lease premium) for this was sued for among two men of the Grenville family.
Wyke
In 1279 William of Wyke was holding this westerly manor.  Divided between descendants Katerina, Joan and Christine in 1353, under the legal principle of female inheritance, "in moieties".  Part holders' surnames thereafter included: Logge, Osbaldeston, Harding, Parker, Manory, Vyne, White in 1580 and in 1584 sold outright to William Harding, who thus acquired the whole again. Henceforth it descended with the manor of Claygate in Ash, Surrey.

Post-Industrial Revolution
Adjacent to the church a London to Portsmouth semaphore tower (now demolished) served in the Napoleonic wars.  The east window was embellished with stained glass, collected and arranged in 1802, at the expense of the Rev. W. Roberts and by the 1840s the whole parish's population was 1424 (which then included Burpham and Wyke).

In 1911 the Victoria County History's guide to the area included the agricultural and economic description:

This pinpoints the area's sands (and hence its low agricultural natural fertility) as being key to Worpledon's abundance of heath and woodlands.  In traditional parish descriptions such unproductive land is described as "waste".

Landmarks and amenities

Whitmoor Common

A large common is at the heart of the parish that has mixed landscapes of heather, copses of woodland, grasslands and bracken.

Clustered around the village centre and its lightly developed localities are heavily wooded commons, managed by Surrey Wildlife Trust, including Broadstreet & Backside Commons, Stringer's Common, Littlefield Common, Whitmoor/Whitmore Common, Jordan Hill, Rickford Common, and Chitty's Common, and occasionally, Whitmoor Common is a collective term for them all.

Memorial hall and recreational grounds
Worplesdon is served by the Worplesdon Memorial Hall, built in 1922 to recall those who died in World War I; it and the adjacent recreation grounds are managed by trustees representing the donors and the Parish Council. A caretaker lives nearby.  Beside the Hall are a playground and tennis and cricket facilities. There are a large events room, a meeting room, and the Sidney Sime Memorial Gallery.

Hotel and convenience shopping

Wood Street Village and Stoughton amenities
Wood Street Village is, unusually, a larger "village" within the historic parish as well as the 19th-century created, civil parish. Stoughton, Guildford has a diverse parade of shops and is well-situated to access most of the village.

Economy

Worplesdon railway station has 1–3 services per hour to London Waterloo, on Mondays to Saturdays on the Portsmouth Direct Line, as the station between Woking and Guildford, in the east of the village – 31–37 minutes from Waterloo. This is separated from parts of the main village by the gently elevated northwestern flank of wooded Whitmore Common (Jordan Hill or Rickford Common), all of which are part of the village.

Industries in the 2011 census
Taking the parish as a whole: 213 people at the time of the last census were employed in finance and insurance industries.  Despite the heathland only 0.8% of residents in 2011 were employed in quarrying, forestry and agriculture, similarly real estate accounted for 1.2% of residents' occupations. Technical/scientific employers employed 10% of the population, bolstered by the University of Surrey and Institute for Animal Health (with associated major employers in life sciences, space exploration and computing).

Greater than this, education employed 12% of the population (549 people).  Wholesale and retail trade, and the sale/repair of motor vehicles was the most important single category with 639 people.  Next, just behind education, was Human Health and Social Work employing 495 people.  Accommodation and food service activities, if combined with the similar category of arts, entertainment and recreation, employed a similar figure of 440 people.

Two neighbouring villages to the northwest are Pirbright and Deepcut with significant UK Army presences, although the latter's barracks has been redeveloped into homes.  Public Administration and Defence; Compulsory Social Security's total of people was 38 fewer than Manufacturing, which gave employment to 239 people in 2011

Demography and housing

The average level of accommodation in the region composed of detached houses was 28%, the average that was apartments was 22.6%.

The proportion of households in the civil parish who owned their home outright compares to the regional average of 35.1%.  The proportion who owned their home with a loan compares to the regional average of 32.5%.  The remaining % is made up of rented dwellings (plus a negligible % of households living rent-free).

Nearest Settlements

Education
Merrist Wood Agricultural College stands on the hill in the west of the village, encompassing:
A wood and pond
Plant nursery
Arboriculture training area
Equestrian centre
Golf course
Mixed farm

The village’s Perry Hill School closed in 1976 to be replaced by Worplesdon Primary in Fairlands. Worplesdon Primary School caters for 409 students from the ages of 4–11. The head teacher is Mr A Parsons.

Youth outreach
The Normandy Youth Center serves the area by sponsoring community-based programs targeting youth in the area (especially marginal groups and minorities) for the purpose of increasing exposure to educational opportunities and building a stronger community.

Sports

Cricket
The Worplesdon and Burpham Cricket Club traces its origins to 1890, and Worplesdon & Burpham CC was established in 1999 following the merger of Worplesdon CC and Burpham CC.

There are two teams playing on Saturday in the Fullers Brewery Surrey County League and one team on Sunday playing in The Village League. 
A new pavilion was opened in 2008 providing much larger facilities, a brand new bar and kitchen to supply the all-important cricket teas and post-game drinks.

Directions
Take the A322 leaving Guildford towards Bagshot. When you enter the village of Worplesdon (signposted and still on the A322) the ground is on the left hand side (with the entrance in the lay-by), 100 yards past the Worplesdon Place Hotel.

Other Sports
There is also Worplesdon Phoenix FC playing in the Surrey Counties Intermediate League and Guildford and Woking Alliance League and, since 1991, Worplesdon Tennis Club, with a new clubhouse (2005).

Worplesdon Rangers FC is another football club based in and around the parish; the club was founded in 2001 and caters for pre-reception to Under 18 age-groups playing in the Surrey Primary League. Committee meetings are held monthly at Jacobs Well Village Hall.

Notable residents
Thomas Comber, Master of Trinity College, Cambridge, rector of Worplesdon (1615–42)
William Ingalton (1794–1866), painter and builder
Lt. Col. Montgomery, of Rickford (1911)
Stephen Smith, early Quaker, gave Friends' Burial Ground (buried there 1672) (sold 1852).
John Burton, founding trustee for the colony of Georgia, theologian and rector of Worplesdon (1766–71).
Sir J. L. Walker, CIE of Worplesdon Place (1911); 

In the early 20th century, Worplesdon was home to the artist Sidney Sime, best known for magazine illustration and work in the books of the varied, particularly fantasy, author Lord Dunsany.

In his later life Frederick Selous chronicled many of his adventures from his home in Worplesdon.  Selous was a British explorer, officer, hunter, and conservationist, famous for his exploits in south and east of Africa.  His real-life adventures inspired Sir H. Rider Haggard's Allan Quatermain character.

Local Government
There is one representative on Surrey County Council, Conservative Keith Witham whose physically large ward extends into Normandy, Surrey. There are three representatives on Guildford Borough Council:

Freedom of the Parish
The following have received the Freedom of the Parish of Worplesdon.

 Mrs. Sandra A. Morgan : 28 November 2021.

References

External links

Surreycc.gov.uk Surrey Government; retrieved 6 April 2007

Villages in Surrey
Borough of Guildford
Civil parishes in Surrey